Menlo is a small unincorporated community in the Willapa Valley of Pacific County, Washington, United States. It was settled in 1851 as a donation land claim. Menlo was named for the California town of Menlo Park in 1893 when the Northern Pacific Railway line was laid down through the Willapa Valley. It was shortened to just Menlo when the sign was cut in half.

Menlo today is home to a general store and post office, the Pacific County Fairgrounds and a secondary/high school — Willapa Valley High School. As Menlo is not a census-designated place, only approximate population information is available for the area; Menlo is located within the Willapa Valley School District, which has a population of 2,231 and covers 289.1 square miles. Menlo is located within Census Tract 9504 of Pacific County, which has a population of 3,921 and covers a larger area than the Willapa Valley School District.

Climate
This region experiences warm (but not hot) and dry summers, with no average monthly temperatures above 71.6 °F.  According to the Köppen Climate Classification system, Menlo has a warm-summer Mediterranean climate, abbreviated "Csb" on climate maps.

References

Unincorporated communities in Washington (state)
Unincorporated communities in Pacific County, Washington